Tomáš Suslov (born 7 June 2002) is a Slovak professional footballer who plays as an attacking midfielder for Eredivisie club Groningen and the Slovakia national team.

Personal life
During the 2022 Russian invasion of Ukraine, Suslov revealed his Ukrainian ancestry through his paternal side and his family got involved in humanitarian aid to affected Ukrainians.

International career
Regarded as one of the finest players of his generation in Slovakia, Suslov has been regularly capped throughout all the categories of the national team. He made his debut for the senior team on 18 November 2020 in a Nations League game against Czech Republic. He substituted Albert Rusnák in the 62nd minute. Despite numerous performances where he showed huge signs of promise and was close to getting his name on the scoresheet, it was in his 11th cap that he scored his first senior international goal in a Nations League game against Belarus in June 2022.

International goals
As of match played 3 June 2022. Scores and results list Slovakia's goal tally first.

References

External links
 Career stats & profile - Voetbal International
 
  
 

2002 births
Living people
Slovak people of Ukrainian descent
Sportspeople from Spišská Nová Ves
Slovak footballers
Association football midfielders
Slovakia international footballers
Slovakia youth international footballers
Slovakia under-21 international footballers
UEFA Euro 2020 players
Eredivisie players
FC Groningen players
Slovak expatriate footballers
Slovak expatriate sportspeople in the Netherlands
Expatriate footballers in the Netherlands